The fourth and final season of Nikita premiered on November 22 and ended on December 27, 2013, containing six episodes. It is based on the French film La Femme Nikita (1990), the remake Point of No Return (1993), and a previous series La Femme Nikita (1997).

Cast and characters

Main cast
 Maggie Q as Nikita Mears
 Shane West as Michael
 Lyndsy Fonseca as Alexandra "Alex" Udinov
 Melinda Clarke as Helen "Amanda" Collins
 Aaron Stanford as Seymour Birkhoff/Lionel Peller
 Noah Bean as Ryan Fletcher
 Devon Sawa as Owen Elliot/Sam Matthews

Recurring cast
 Lyndie Greenwood as Sonya
 David S. Lee as Phillip Jones
 Alex Carter as Matthew Graham
 Judd Nelson as Ronald Peller
 Vincent Ventresca as Trevor Adrian
 John Getz as Senator Ed Chappell

Episodes

References

External links
 
 

2013 American television seasons
Season 4